Goran Hristovski (born 24 January 1976) is a Macedonian retired football defender, who last played for FK Cementarnica 55 in the Macedonian Second League.

International career
He made his senior debut for Macedonia in a February 2003 friendly match against Croatia and has earned a total of 2 caps, scoring no goals. His second and final international was another friendly 5 days later against Poland.

References

External sources
 

1976 births
Living people
Association football defenders
Macedonian footballers
FK Cementarnica 55 players
FK Milano Kumanovo players
Macedonian First Football League players
Macedonian Second Football League players
North Macedonia international footballers